Le Garrec is a surname of Breton origin. Notable people with the surname include:

 Léa Le Garrec (born 1993), French footballer
 Stéphane Le Garrec (born 1969), French footballer and manager

Breton-language surnames